Armando Migliari (29 April 1889 – 15 June 1976) was an Italian film actor. He appeared in 103 films between 1914 and 1965. He was born in Latium, Italy and died in Rome, Italy.

Selected filmography

 The Last of the Bergeracs (1934)
 La Damigella di Bard (1936)
 The Man Who Smiles (1936)
 The Last Days of Pompeo (1937)
 The Castiglioni Brothers, (1937)
 It Was I! (1937)
 To Live (1937)
 These Children (1937)
 Destiny (1938)
 The Two Mothers (1938)
 The Count of Brechard (1938)
 Triumph of Love (1938)
 At Your Orders, Madame (1939)
 The Sons of the Marquis Lucera (1939)
 Wealth Without a Future (1939)
 In the Country Fell a Star (1939)
 Heartbeat (1939)
 The Marquis of Ruvolito (1939)
 Naples Will Never Die (1939)
 We Were Seven Widows (1939)
 Defendant, Stand Up! (1939)
 Lo vedi come sei... lo vedi come sei? (1939)
 Antonio Meucci (1940)
 A Romantic Adventure (1940)
 Maddalena, Zero for Conduct (1940)
 The Last Dance (1941)
 A Garibaldian in the Convent (1942)
 The Countess of Castiglione (1942)
 The Taming of the Shrew (1942)
 I Live as I Please (1942)
 Torrents of Spring (1942)
 Luisa Sanfelice (1942)
 Invisible Chains (1942)
 Labbra serrate (1942)
 Stasera niente di nuovo (1942)
 Quattro passi fra le nuvole (1942)
 Music on the Run (1943)
 Maria Malibran (1943)
 A Little Wife (1943)
 Giacomo the Idealist (1943)
 The Children Are Watching Us (1944)
 L'onorevole Angelina (1947)
 The Ungrateful Heart (1951)
 The Last Sentence (1951)
 The Piano Tuner Has Arrived (1952)
 La tua donna (1954)
 Cardinal Lambertini (1954)
 Il Conte di Matera (1957)

References

External links

1889 births
1976 deaths
Italian male film actors
Italian male silent film actors
People from Frosinone
20th-century Italian male actors